The Republic of Mainz was the first democratic state in the current German territory and was centered in Mainz. A product of the French Revolutionary Wars, it lasted from March to July 1793.

Context 
During the War of the First Coalition against France, the Prussian and Austrian troops that had invaded France retreated after the Battle of Valmy, allowing the French revolutionary army to counterattack. The troops of General Custine entered the Palatinate in late September and occupied Mainz on 21 October 1792. The ruler of Mainz, Elector-Archbishop Friedrich Karl Joseph von Erthal, had fled the city.

Jacobin club 
Most of the founding members of the Jacobin club were professors and students of the University of Mainz, together with the university librarian, Georg Forster, some merchants and Mainz state officials.

Founding 
By order of the French National Convention, elections in the French-occupied territories west of the Rhine were held on 24 February 1793. 130 cities and towns sent their deputies to Mainz. The convention declared the represented territory (which extended to Bingen in the west and to Landau in the south) to be free and democratic, and disclaimed any ties to the empire. The convention's president, Andreas Joseph Hofmann, proclaimed the Rhenish-German Free State from the balcony of the Deutschhaus. On 21 March 1793, it was decided to seek the accession of the Free State to France and delegates (among them Georg Forster and Adam Lux) were sent to Paris. The French National Convention granted the request on 30 March.

End 
Soon after, Prussian troops retook all the French-occupied territory except for the heavily fortified city of Mainz itself. After a long siege in which much of the city was destroyed, Prussian and Austrian troops conquered the city on 22 July 1793. The republic ended, and the Jacobins were persecuted until 1795 when Mainz came under French control again.

Notes

Further reading 

Former states and territories of Rhineland-Palatinate
Republic of Mainz